This article is a selection of films both fictional and non-fictional which focus on revolution, revolutionary movements and/or revolutionary characters as a theme.

Films

See also 
 List of historical films
 List of films that depict class struggle

References

Anarchism
Revolution